The 2011–12 Rostov season was the 3rd straight season that the club played in the Russian Premier League, the highest tier of football in Russia. They finished the season in 13th place, meaning they had to win a Relegation Playoff against Shinnik Yaroslavl, which they won 4–0 on aggregate. Rostov also competed in the 2010–11 & 2011–12 Russian Cup reaching the semi-finals in both.

Rostov started the season with Oleh Protasov as manager, but he was sacked as manager on 13 May 2011, being replaced by Volodymyr Lyutyi in a caretaker capacity. Lyutyi himself was sacked as caretaker on 20 June 2011, being replaced by Andrei Talalayev, also as caretaker. On 1 July Sergei Balakhnin was appointed as Protasov's permanent successor, but was replaced as manager on 18 April 2012 by Anatoli Baidachny.

Squad

Reserve squad

Transfers

Winter 2010–11

In:

Out:

Summer 2011

In:

Out:

Winter 2011–12

In:

Out:

Competitions

Premier League

First phase

Results by round

Results

Table

Relegation Group

Results by round

Results

Table

Relegation play-offs

Russian Cup

2010-11

2011-12

Squad statistics

Appearances and goals

|-
|colspan="14"|Players away from Rostov on loan during the season:

|-
|colspan="14"|Players left Rostov during the season:

|}

Goal scorers

Clean sheets

Disciplinary record

Notes

References

FC Rostov seasons
Rostov